Weird: The Al Yankovic Story is a 2022 American biographical parody film directed by Eric Appel (in his feature directorial debut), who co-wrote the screenplay with "Weird Al" Yankovic. The film is a satire of biopics and is loosely based on Yankovic's life and career as an accordionist and parody songwriter. It stars Daniel Radcliffe as Yankovic, along with Evan Rachel Wood, Rainn Wilson, Toby Huss, Arturo Castro, and Julianne Nicholson in supporting roles.

A fake trailer for a satirical biographical film was produced by Appel for Funny or Die in 2010. Yankovic showed the trailer at his concerts, which led to fans questioning when the full-length film would be made and leading Appel and Yankovic to develop the film's concept together. Weird: The Al Yankovic Story was filmed on a budget of around $8 million over eighteen days between February and March 2022. It premiered at the Toronto International Film Festival on September 8, 2022, and was released on The Roku Channel on November 4, 2022. The film received positive reviews, with particular praise for its humor and Radcliffe's performance.

Plot
Young Alfred "Al" Yankovic becomes interested in parodying songs despite his father's disapproval. Al's mother secretly purchases an accordion for him, but his father destroys it when Al is caught at an illicit polka party, thus straining Al's relationship with his parents.

Years later, an older Al is living with his roommates Steve, Jim, and Bermuda, and trying to join bands as an accordion player but he is constantly rejected. While listening to "My Sharona" on the radio and fixing a bologna sandwich, Al is inspired to write "My Bologna". He sends the song to a local radio DJ, who puts it on the air immediately; he then goes to Scotti Brothers Records, where the brothers mock him, but are willing to reconsider if Al gains more experience.

Al performs "I Love Rocky Road" for the first time at a biker bar, his roommates stepping in to fill out his band and make the performance a success. Al catches the interest of Dr. Demento, who offers to be his manager while suggesting he go by the stage name "Weird Al". At a party hosted by Dr. Demento, the doctor's rival Wolfman Jack dares Al to prove himself by parodying Queen's "Another One Bites the Dust" with bassist John Deacon present. Al comes up with "Another One Rides the Bus", impressing the celebrities in attendance. Al lands his record contract, and his debut album goes multi-platinum, with the original artists experiencing a "Yankovic bump" in record sales and Al being feted by Oprah Winfrey.

Al calls home to find his father is still dismissive of him. Dr. Demento suggests Al try to make his own original song, which he refuses. However, after Dr. Demento gives him guacamole laced with LSD, Al comes up with an original new song, which becomes his next hit, "Eat It". Madonna, in search of the "Yankovic bump", begins a relationship with Al to convince him to parody her song "Like a Virgin", though he insists he now only writes original songs. Dr. Demento and Al's bandmates warn him that Madonna is a bad influence, but they continue their romance. Just before a major show, Al learns that Michael Jackson has taken "Eat It" and parodied it as "Beat It", which angers him since he believes people will assume "Eat It" is a parody of "Beat It". An intoxicated Al suffers a near-fatal car accident and is rushed to the hospital, where he comes up with "Like a Surgeon" after regaining consciousness. He premieres the song at a show that same night, while still heavily injured, but when he is reminded that "Eat It" is the last song for the show, he gets drunk on stage, insults the crowd, and is arrested for lewdness.

Once released, Al confesses to Madonna that he fears he has alienated everybody who cared about him and that she is the only one he has left. Suddenly, Madonna is captured by agents of Pablo Escobar, who is a huge fan of Al and uses the kidnapping to coerce him to play at his fortieth birthday party. Al flies to Colombia and goes on a rampage to break into Escobar's compound, where he confronts the drug lord. After refusing to play a song for him, he gets into a shootout and kills Escobar and his mercenaries to free Madonna. With the kingpin dead, Madonna tries to talk Al into giving up music and helping her take over his drug empire, but Al rejects her.

Al returns home to work in his father's factory, as his father had always wanted; but Al's father admits that Al never belonged in that line of work and that he'd secretly supported Al's chosen path all along. The elder Yankovic reveals he grew up in an Amish community and was excommunicated for taking up the accordion, prompting him to prevent Al from making the same mistake. Al then brings his father's song, "Amish Paradise", to the stage, winning him a major award in 1985 before being assassinated onstage by one of Madonna's henchmen.

Cast

The pool party scene features many cameos, including Conan O'Brien as Andy Warhol; Jorma Taccone as Pee-wee Herman; Nina West as Divine; Akiva Schaffer as Alice Cooper; Demetri Martin as Tiny Tim; Paul F. Tompkins as Gallagher; David Dastmalchian as John Deacon; and Emo Philips as Salvador Dalí. In the bar scene, Patton Oswalt plays a heckler, while Michael McKean appears as the MC. Josh Groban plays a waiter, while Seth Green voices a radio DJ. Yankovic's real-life wife, Suzanne Krajewski, appears uncredited as Tony's wife Sylvie Vartan.

Production

Development

In 2010, Funny or Die released a fake trailer for a satirical biographical film titled Weird: The Al Yankovic Story directed by Eric Appel and starring Aaron Paul as musician "Weird Al" Yankovic. Additional co-stars in the three-minute-long trailer included Yankovic himself, Olivia Wilde, Gary Cole, Mary Steenburgen, and Patton Oswalt. At the time, the fake trailer was intended to parody prior biographical films on musicians, such as Ray (2004) and Walk the Line (2005).

Yankovic would show the trailer during his concert tours leading some fans to think it was for a real film or encouraging him to make it one. Following the success of other musician biopics such as Bohemian Rhapsody (2018) and Rocketman (2019), Yankovic began to legitimately consider the idea of making a full-length film. He and Appel began to shop the idea around Hollywood, but the studios' initial impressions were that the film was going to be in the vein of a Zucker, Abrahams and Zucker full-on parody and passed on the idea. The two looked at common tropes in other musician biopics, finding that facts about the musician's life were often changed arbitrarily, and used a similar approach to writing Yankovic's biographical story with the same type of creative freedom. They opted to retain the setting of the film within Yankovic's early career between 1979 and 1985, only going off this period for the inclusion of "Amish Paradise" from 1996 at the end of the film. Some events in the film are based on facts from Yankovic's life: he did receive his first accordion from a traveling salesman; "My Bologna" was recorded in a public bathroom, though in real life, this was a bathroom across from the KCPR radio station offices; there has been a "Yankovic effect" in that being parodied by Yankovic helped boost the success of the original songs by other musicians, notably with Nirvana and Yankovic's parody "Smells Like Nirvana"; and Madonna did originally come up with the concept of Yankovic's parody "Like a Surgeon", which Yankovic had heard about and agreed was a good idea.

An actual full-length film of the same name was officially announced in January 2022, with Daniel Radcliffe set to star in the title role. It was directed by Appel from a screenplay he co-wrote with Yankovic. Appel jokingly stated, "When Weird Al first sat me down against my will and told me his life story, I didn't believe any of it, but I knew that we had to make a movie about it."

Yankovic and Appel had known that Radcliffe had been a fan of classic comedic musicians such as Tom Lehrer; for his part, Radcliffe felt that his November 2010 appearance on The Graham Norton Show, during which he sang a rendition of Lehrer's song "The Elements", was the reason for his casting: "I guess Al saw that and was like, 'This guy maybe gets it.' And so he picked me." The actor was already a fan of Yankovic's work through his own appreciation as well as that of his girlfriend, Erin Darke, who would play Yankovic's music on road trips. He was also looking to expand his acting repertoire, believing the part gave him more creative capabilities similar to his role in Swiss Army Man (2016).

Casting

As part of his preparation, Radcliffe learned the principles of playing the accordion, Yankovic's signature instrument, through video tutorials Yankovic had made for him. Radcliffe sang the songs live on camera while filming, but his vocals were replaced with pre-recorded ones by Yankovic in the final product. Yankovic and Appel would later express some regret over not letting Radcliffe perform his own vocals, given the actor's Broadway background, but ultimately felt that having Radcliffe lip-sync to Yankovic's real voice was integral to the biopic parody, as it was the method used with Rami Malek and his Freddie Mercury portrayal in Bohemian Rhapsody.

In March 2022, Evan Rachel Wood, Rainn Wilson, Toby Huss, and Julianne Nicholson were confirmed to star. A few months later in July, it was revealed Quinta Brunson would also star. Even though Weird is a parody, the filmmakers sought to cast actors known for primarily dramatic roles. Appel believed the humor would then come from the actors playing their roles in a serious, grounded manner, as if they were in a dramatic biopic, despite the absurdity of the scenes.

Yankovic reached out to his "holiday card mailing list" to bring a number of celebrities to cameo in the film, most shown during the Dr. Demento pool party scene. While the script called for Al to be challenged by Freddie Mercury at the pool party, terms of Yankovic's agreement with the band Queen for "Another One Rides the Bus" was that Yankovic could not mention Mercury. They reached out to The Lonely Island (Andy Samberg, Akiva Schaffer, and Jorma Taccone) to appear as the other members of Queen instead, but while Samberg was unavailable, Schaffer and Taccone still wanted to participate in the film, and were cast as Alice Cooper and Pee-wee Herman, respectively. Lin-Manuel Miranda contacted Yankovic within minutes of the announcement of the film's production, requesting a role in it, and Yankovic was able to fit his cameo as an ER doctor during a time when Miranda was in Los Angeles.

Patton Oswalt, who played Dr. Demento in the original short, had been set to play this role in the film, but he broke his foot shortly before shooting began, and due to the tight schedule, the production could not afford to wait. They were able to bring in Wilson to play the role three days before filming commenced. Oswalt was still able to cameo in the film as a heckler in a bar. Aaron Paul, who played Yankovic in the original short, had been set to cameo as the said bar heckler, but he came down with COVID-19 during the filming period and was unable to participate.

Filming
Once Radcliffe signed on to star, The Roku Channel agreed to invest in Weird. The film had a budget of around $8 million and was shot over eighteen days, after initially being planned for twenty-two days. Filming was limited to eighteen days as part of Roku's contract due to a combination of cost-saving measures and the ongoing COVID-19 pandemic. Principal photography was originally planned to take place in Atlanta to take advantage of tax breaks, but Roku allowed the film to be shot in Los Angeles, which enabled Yankovic and Appel to bring in a number of celebrities as cameos. Filming began on February 10, 2022. Radcliffe concluded shooting his scenes after sixteen days on March 4, in Pomona, California. The pool party scene was shot in Tarzana, California. Overall filming wrapped on March 8, 2022. Post-production was done while Yankovic was on The Unfortunate Return of the Ridiculously Self-Indulgent, Ill-Advised Vanity Tour in 2022, with Yankovic working remotely with Appel's team to finalize the film.

The film includes a brief glimpse of Yankovic's "Eat It" video, though with Radcliffe's face digitally superimposed on Yankovic's. Yankovic had the 16mm footage of the original video which he digitized in 4K by himself to be used for the superimposing, and which he later released onto YouTube after re-editing the footage while he was on The Unfortunate Return of the Ridiculously Self-Indulgent, Ill-Advised Vanity Tour to match the original video frame-for-frame.

Cultural references
Dr. Demento's pool party draws inspiration from a similar scene in the film Boogie Nights (1997), while Al being arrested onstage is based on the 1969 incident with the Doors frontman Jim Morrison during a concert in Miami. The end-credits scene includes a parody of Carrie (1976), in which Madonna comes to visit Al's grave, only to be grabbed at the wrist by a zombified arm.

Music

Weird: The Al Yankovic Story (Original Soundtrack) is the soundtrack album accompanying the film. Yankovic released it digitally the same day of the film's release, on November 4, 2022. The album includes an original song recorded by Yankovic for the film, "Now You Know", several of his parodies featured in the film with new recorded versions, and the soundtrack compositions by Leo Birenberg and Zach Robinson. It was released on CD on January 27, 2023, and is set to release on vinyl on May 19, 2023.

Release
Weird: The Al Yankovic Story had its world premiere at the Royal Alexandra Theatre during the Toronto International Film Festival on September 8, 2022, and was released on The Roku Channel on November 4, 2022. Yankovic requested that the film have a limited release in theaters to make it eligible for the 95th Academy Awards; Roku declined, preferring for the film to be instead eligible for the 75th Primetime Emmy Awards.

Village Roadshow Pictures (under the release by Universal Pictures) acquired the rights to distribute the film in all international markets excluding Canada, Latin America, the United Kingdom, and the United States.

Australian distributor Umbrella Entertainment announced a release on DVD, Blu-ray and 4K Ultra HD, with a release date in April 2023.

Reception

On the review aggregator website Rotten Tomatoes, the film holds an approval rating of 83% based on 150 reviews, with an average of 7.1/10. The website's consensus reads, "Suitably silly, Weird: The Al Yankovic Story spoofs the standard biopic formula with all the good-natured abandon fans will expect." Metacritic assigned the film a weighted average score of 70 out of 100 based on 41 critics, indicating "generally favorable reviews". 

Owen Gleiberman of Variety reviewed, "Weird is witty and inventive enough to sustain what could, in lesser hands, have been a one-joke movie, an SNL riff on itself. The film's ultimate joke is that 'Weird Al' Yankovic's entire career was a joke — not just because he made so-daft-they're-funny versions of other people's songs, but because what he did made him a court jester of imitation." Leah Greenblatt of Entertainment Weekly gave the film a grade of B, writing that the film is "an alternative-facts fever dream so bent on the certifiably ridiculous that it circles back around somehow to sweetness. You don't need any of it, really, but as far as celebrity hagiographies go, you kind of can't beat it." Nick Allen of RogerEbert.com gave the film 3.5 stars out of 4 and praised Radcliffe's performance as Yankovic. Reviewer Amy Nicholson, writing in the New York Times called the film an "uproarious sham biopic" and praised Radcliffe as "winningly guileless in his performance, twitching his costume-y eyebrows and mustache like gentle bunny ears even as he lip-syncs 'Another One Rides the Bus' with such commitment that his neck veins nearly pop." Kellen Quigley of the Salamanca Press compared the film favorably to the 2007 parody biopic Walk Hard: The Dewey Cox Story, noting that both films had come shortly after a wave of Oscar bait biopics.  Rafael Motamayor at IGN gave it 9 out of 10 and called it "amazing".

Accolades

References

External links
 

2022 comedy films
2020s American films
2020s biographical films
2020s English-language films
2020s parody films
American biographical films
American parody films
Biographical films about singers
Comedy films based on actual events
Cultural depictions of Madonna
Films set in the 1960s
Films set in the 1970s
Films set in the 1980s
Films shot in Los Angeles
Films shot in Los Angeles County, California
Films impacted by the COVID-19 pandemic
Films with screenplays by "Weird Al" Yankovic
Funny or Die
Cultural depictions of Pablo Escobar
"Weird Al" Yankovic
Cultural depictions of Salvador Dalí
Cultural depictions of Andy Warhol
2022 directorial debut films